The siege of Córdoba can refer to the following battles:

 Siege of Córdoba (711)
 Siege of Córdoba (1009)
 Siege of Córdoba (1010)
 Siege and fall of Córdoba (1013) 
 Siege of Córdoba (1150)
 Siege of Córdoba (1236)